Chlorthiamide is an organic compound with the chemical formula C7H5Cl2NS used as an herbicide.

Chloroarenes
Herbicides
Thioamides